The Revolutionary Socialist Workers' Party (DSİP) is a Trotskyist party in Turkey. It was founded by Şevket Doğan Tarkan and his friends from Trotskyist journal Socialist Worker in 1997. The group had links to far-left Kurtuluş Hareketi (Liberation Movement) before the 1980 Turkish coup d'état.

An opposition grouping within DSİP named Antikapitalist was formed following a split in DSİP. The group had no relation with DSİP after that split.

The party did not participate in elections in Turkey but supported left-wing electoral alliances. At the 2007 elections, they declared support for the independent candidates of Democratic Society Party.

The DSİP is the Turkish section of the International Socialist Tendency. The DSİP supports the political magazine Altüst.

The party is one of the participants in the Peoples' Democratic Congress, a political initiative instrumental in founding the Peoples' Democratic Party in 2012.

References

External links

1997 establishments in Turkey
Communist parties in Turkey
Far-left politics in Turkey
Peoples' Democratic Congress
Political parties established in 1997
Trotskyist organizations in Turkey